Radabad (also Romanized as Ra‘dābād) is a village in Garizat Rural District, Nir District, Taft County, Yazd Province, Iran. At the 2006 census, its population was 135, in 34 families.

References 

Populated places in Taft County